Pachycondyla petiolosa is an extinct species of ant in the formicid subfamily Ponerinae described by from a fossil found in Europe.  P. parvula is one of six Lutetian Pachycondyla species.

History and classification
When described Pachycondyla petiolosa was known from two fossil insects which are compression-impression fossils preserved in layers of soft sedimentary rock.  Along with other well preserved insect fossils, the P. petiolosa specimens were collected from layers of Lutetian Messel Formation rock in the Messel pit World Heritage Site.  The Messel formation is composed of brown coals, oil shales, and bituminous shale, which preserved numerous insects, fish, birds, reptiles, and terrestrial mammals as a notable lagerstätten.  The area is a preserved maar lake which initially formed approximately 47 million years ago as the result of volcanic explosions.

At the time of description, the holotype specimen, number SMF MeI 1893, along with the paratype SMF MeI 1427 were preserved in the Senckenberg Research Station Messel fossil collections. The fossils were described by Gennady Dlussky and Sonja Wedmann in a 2012 paper on the poneromorph ants of Messel.  In the type description Dlussky and Wedmann named the species P. petiolosa, with the specific epithet derived from the Latin "petiolosus", chosen in recognition of notably visible petiole.

The species is one of six Pachycondyla which have been described from Messel Formation fossils.  All six of the species were described by Dlussky and Wedmann in the same 2012 paper, the other five being P. eocenica, P. lutzi, P.? messeliana, P. parvula, and P. petrosa.  Another eight fossil species have been described from fossils in North America, Europe, and Asia.

Description
The antennae scape extends just beyond the  occipital margin of the head, and the funicular segments in the middle are longer than wide. The eyes are oval in shape and placed slightly behind of the head's midpoint. Where preserved the mandibles comprise less than half the length of the head. The petiole is rounded in side view, with a high, thick scale, and there are visible hairs preserved on the last segment of the petiole.

References

External links

†Pachycondyla petiolosa
Fossil taxa described in 2012
Hymenoptera of Europe
Fossil ant taxa
Prehistoric life of Europe
Insects described in 2012